Lander County is a county in the U.S. state of Nevada. As of the 2020 census, the population was 5,734. Its county seat is Battle Mountain.

History
Lander County was created in 1862 as the result of a mining boom on the Reese River along the old pony express line, taking a considerable portion of Churchill and Humboldt counties with it. Named for Frederick W. Lander, chief engineer of a federal wagon route and Special Indian Agent in the area, it was one of the original 11 counties of Nevada when statehood was granted in 1864. Its first county seat was Jacob's Spring in 1862, which was moved to Austin in 1863, and finally Battle Mountain in 1979. Eventually, Lander County would be known as the "mother of counties", since three other counties in Nevada were later formed from it: Elko, White Pine, and Eureka.

Geography

The  summit of Bunker Hill, located in the Toiyabe Range near the Nye County border, is the highest point in the county; while the county's most topographically prominent peak is Mount Lewis.

Major highways

  Interstate 80
  Interstate 80 Business (Battle Mountain)
  U.S. Route 50
  State Route 304
  State Route 305
  State Route 306
  State Route 376
  State Route 722
  State Route 806

Adjacent counties
 Elko County - north
 Eureka County - east
 Nye County - south
 Churchill County - west
 Pershing County - west
 Humboldt County - northwest

National protected area
 Toiyabe National Forest (part)

Demographics

2000 census
At the 2000 census, there were 5,794 people, 2,093 households, and 1,523 families living in the county. The population density was 1 person per square mile (~2.5/km2). There were 2,780 housing units at an average density of 0 per square mile (0/km2). The racial makeup of the county was 84.41% White, 0.21% Black or African American, 3.99% Native American, 0.35% Asian, 0.03% Pacific Islander, 8.66% from other races, and 2.35% from two or more races.  18.52% of the population were Hispanic or Latino of any race.
Of the 2,093 households 39.70% had children under the age of 18 living with them, 59.70% were married couples living together, 8.10% had a female householder with no husband present, and 27.20% were non-families. 22.30% of households were one person and 5.00% were one person aged 65 or older. The average household size was 2.73 and the average family size was 3.23.

The age distribution was 32.20% under the age of 18, 6.80% from 18 to 24, 29.00% from 25 to 44, 25.00% from 45 to 64, and 7.00% 65 or older. The median age was 34 years. For every 100 females there were 105.50 males. For every 100 females age 18 and over, there were 105.50 males.

The median household income was $46,067 and the median family income was $51,538. Males had a median income of $45,375 versus $22,197 for females. The per capita income for the county was $16,998. About 8.60% of families and 12.50% of the population were below the poverty line, including 13.50% of those under age 18 and 12.90% of those age 65 or over.

2010 census
At the 2010 census, there were 5,775 people, 2,213 households, and 1,545 families living in the county. The racial makeup of the county was 84.0% white, 4.2% American Indian, 0.4% Asian, 0.3% black or African American, 8.6% from other races, and 2.5% from two or more races. Those of Hispanic or Latino origin made up 21.1% of the population. In terms of ancestry, 19.4% were German, 13.6% were English, 12.2% were Irish, and 12.0% were American.

Of the 2,213 households, 37.1% had children under the age of 18 living with them, 54.5% were married couples living together, 9.4% had a female householder with no husband present, 30.2% were non-families, and 25.6% of households were made up of individuals. The average household size was 2.60 and the average family size was 3.14. The median age was 37.1 years.

The median household income was $66,525 and the median family income  was $67,157. Males had a median income of $62,932 versus $33,056 for females. The per capita income for the county was $25,287. About 11.7% of families and 12.2% of the population were below the poverty line, including 17.0% of those under age 18 and 7.4% of those age 65 or over.

Politics

Communities
Lander County has no incorporated communities. The following places are located in Lander County:

Census-designated places
Austin
Battle Mountain (county seat)
Kingston

Unincorporated community
Pittsburg

Ghost town
Clifton
Galena

See also

 National Register of Historic Places listings in Lander County, Nevada

References

Further reading
Theodore, T.G. and G.M. Jones. (1992). Geochemistry and geology of gold in jasperoid, Elephant Head area, Lander County, Nevada [U.S. Geological Survey Bulletin 2009]. Washington, D.C.:  U.S. Department of the Interior, U.S. Geological Survey.

External links
 
 Battle Mountain Chamber of Commerce
 Greater Austin Chamber of Commerce
 Austin Branch Library
 Battle Mountain Branch Library
 Nevada Central Narrow Gauge
 

 
1861 establishments in Nevada Territory
Populated places established in 1861